Bucculatrix tetanota is a moth in the family Bucculatricidae. The species was described by Edward Meyrick in 1918. It is found in India.

References

Bucculatricidae
Moths described in 1918
Taxa named by Edward Meyrick
Moths of Asia